"Dumb" is the debut single from British singer Tich. The song was released in the United Kingdom as a digital download on 13 May 2013. The song has peaked at number 23 on the UK Singles Chart and at number 22 in Scotland.

Music video
A music video to accompany the release of "Dumb" was first released onto YouTube on 12 March 2013 at a total length of three minutes and twenty-three seconds.

Track listing

Chart performance

Release history

References

2013 debut singles
2013 songs
Tich (singer) songs
Songs written by Tich (singer)
Songs written by Nick Atkinson
Songs written by Jax Jones
Song recordings produced by Jax Jones
All Around the World Productions singles